Street Fighter II: Champion Edition, released as  (stylized as Street Fighter II′ with a prime symbol) in Japan, is a fighting game released by Capcom in 1992. It was launched for arcades and converted to several video game consoles. It is the first of several updated versions of Street Fighter II, and part of the Street Fighter series. The main changes are the addition of the four grand masters (the final four computer-controlled opponents in the single-player mode) as playable characters and mirror matches. The fighting techniques of the eight main characters from the original game were further balanced for competitive play.

Champion Edition was followed several months later by Street Fighter II Turbo.

Gameplay

The gameplay is consistent with the Street Fighter II sub-series, with several changes from the original World Warrior edition.

In addition to the eight main characters, the four Shadaloo Bosses (Balrog (Boxer), Vega (Claw), Sagat, and M. Bison (Dictator)), are now playable characters. The Shadaloo Bosses were toned down considerably from the previous iterations, but remain relatively strong compared to the standard eight fighters. The returning eight main characters' techniques and priorities were further balanced for competition between different characters. Ryu's and Ken's common fighting techniques were further differentiated.

In World Warrior, both players are not allowed to choose the same character. This restriction has been eliminated in Champion Edition, allowing for "mirror matches".

Minor graphical changes include color improvements, particularly for background stages. The portraits for all the characters and endings of some of the returning characters were redrawn. There is new music for the end credits sequence.

Releases

PC Engine
The PC Engine version was published by NEC Home Electronics, developed by Capcom, and released exclusively in Japan on June 12, 1993. Unlike the Super NES version of The World Warrior, it includes the barrel-breaking bonus stage and numerous sound clips. This version was released on a 20-Megabit HuCard, and with optional controllers with more buttons. This version was released on Virtual Console on November 16, 2009.

Mega Drive/Genesis
It is the first of two Street Fighter II versions for the console and is in a 24 megabit cartridge. A six-button control pad was made primarily for it.

This version was originally intended to be a standalone port of Champion Edition, similar to the PC Engine version. The Mega Drive/Genesis version was announced in March 1993, and was originally intended for release around July 1993. However, the game's release was later delayed to September 1993. Following the announcement of Street Fighter II Turbo for the SNES, Sega had ordered its version to be delayed so that Capcom could add all of the extra content from the Turbo version as well, resulting in the title change.

Street Fighter II: Special Champion Edition was released as a plug and play system in 2005 as part of the "Play TV Legends" series by Radica. It also includes the Genesis version of Ghouls 'n Ghosts.

X68000
On November 26, 1993, Capcom released an X68000 port of Champion Edition exclusively in Japan, which consisted of four floppy disks. The port is almost identical to the arcade version, with identical graphics and almost identical soundtrack. The game includes a joystick adapter for the Super Famicom and Mega Drive versions of Capcom's CPS Fighter joystick controller. On an X68030 with multiple PCM (pulse-code modulation) drivers installed, the music and voice quality can match that of the arcade version's ADPCM sound system.

Master System
A Master System port of Champion Edition was released in 1997 in the Brazilian market, published by Tec Toy, although the character portraits in the player select screen are based on Super Street Fighter II. It features only eight characters; Dhalsim, E. Honda, Zangief and Vega are not in this version.

Other releases
Street Fighter II Turbo for the SNES, while based on the succeeding game in the series, allows players to choose between Champion Edition rules (Normal mode) and Hyper Fighting rules (Turbo mode).

The arcade version is included in Street Fighter Collection 2 (Capcom Generation 5) for the PlayStation and Sega Saturn, as well as Capcom Classics Collection Vol. 1 for the PlayStation 2 and Xbox and Capcom Classics Collection: Reloaded for PlayStation Portable. The company Arcade1Up later released a home arcade cabinet featuring Street Fighter II': Champion Edition, Super Street Fighter II: The New Challengers and Super Street Fighter II Turbo.

Reception

Arcade
In Japan alone, 140,000 Street Fighter II Dash arcade hardware units were sold at  each, earning ¥22.4 billion ($182 million) in hardware sales revenue (equivalent to $ in ). In the United States, between 20,000 and 25,000 Champion Edition arcade units were sold, similar to Street Fighter II: The World Warrior. This totals about 160,000165,000 Champion Edition arcade units sold in Japan and the United States.

In Japan, Game Machine listed Street Fighter II Dash in its May 15, 1992 issue as the most successful table arcade cabinet of the month, outperforming games such as Sonic Wings (Aero Fighters). Street Fighter II Dash went on to become the second highest-grossing arcade game of 1992, just below The World Warrior. Dash was also the fourth highest-grossing arcade game of 1993 in Japan.

In the United States, Champion Edition drew a high amount of orders upon its debut in March 1992. It was number one on RePlays May 1992 coin-op earnings chart for upright arcade cabinets, and remained at the top of the charts through summer up until September 1992. Champion Edition was also the top-grossing overall video game on the Play Meter arcade charts in June 1992, and remained the top-grossing video game on the Play Meter arcade charts through September 1992. It went on to be the highest-grossing dedicated arcade game of 1992 in the United States, according to RePlay and the Amusement & Music Operators Association (AMOA). Later on RePlays charts, Champion Edition was No. 4 on the upright cabinet charts in April and May 1993. It was one of the top five highest-grossing conversion kits of 1993.

In the United Kingdom, the game was also a major hit, like the original Street Fighter II. On Australia's Timezone monthly arcade charts published in the June 1992 issue of Leisure Line magazine, Street Fighter II: Champion Edition was the top-grossing arcade conversion kit.

Street Fighter II': Champion Editions worldwide arcade earnings exceeded $2.3 billion in gross revenue (equivalent to $ in ). This makes it one of the top three highest-grossing arcade games of all time, after Pac-Man (1980) and Space Invaders (1978).

Accolades
Upon its North American debut at the American Coin Machine Exposition (ACME) in March 1993, it was declared the "game of the show" by RePlay and Play Meter magazines.

Street Fighter II Dash was awarded Best Game of 1992 in the Sixth Annual Grand Prize , as published in the February 1993 issue of Gamest , winning once again in the category of Best Action Game. Dash placed  3 in Best VGM (video game music), No. 6 in Best Graphics, No. 5 in Best Direction. The Street Fighter II Image Album was the No. 1 Best Album in the same issue, with the Drama CD version of Street Fighter II tied for No. 7 with the soundtrack for Star Blade. The List of Best Characters was not dominated by Street Fighter II characters this time, with the only character at the Top Ten being Chun-Li at No. 3.

Special Champion Edition
The Sega Mega Drive/Genesis version, Street Fighter II': Special Champion Edition, yielded sales of 1.665 million cartridges. This version was below Capcom's sales expectations, due in part to competition from the original Mortal Kombat (1992). This version was nevertheless a best-seller in Japan, the UK, and US.

The Mega Drive version, Special Champion Edition, received positive reviews. In November 1993, Famitsu magazine's Reader Cross Review gave II' Plus a 10 out of 10. It received 10 out of 10 for both graphics and addiction from Mega, who described it as "a candidate for best game ever and without a doubt the best beat-'em-up of all time" and gave it an overall 92% score. MegaTech scored it 95%, and commented "the greatest coin-op hits the Megadrive in perfect form". Edge gave the PC Engine version of Champion Edition a score of 8 out of 10.

Notes

References

Further reading

External links

1992 video games
Arcade video games
Fighting games
2D fighting games
Capcom Power System Changer games
CP System games
Master System games
X68000 games
Street Fighter II: Special Champion Edition
Street Fighter games
TurboGrafx-16 games
Video game sequels
Video games developed in Japan
Virtual Console games
Multiplayer and single-player video games